Vienna (also known as Orson Welles' Vienna or Spying in Vienna) is a 1968 short film directed by Orson Welles. It was originally produced as part of his abandoned television special, Orson's Bag, which was made for CBS. However, in 1969, with the project close to completion, CBS withdrew their funding over Welles' long-running disputes with US authorities regarding his tax status. The film remained uncompleted. Despite its name, Vienna freely mixes footage shot in Vienna, Zagreb, and a Los Angeles studio. An 8-minute segment was restored by the Munich Film Museum in 1999.

Plot of restored segment
Vienna is an eclectic blend of faux-documentary and comical skits. Welles presents a leisurely guided tour of "Vienna," commenting on the city and its inhabitants. He visits the Sacher Hotel, and the Wiener Riesenrad (Giant Ferris Wheel) at the Prater amusement park, both of which appeared in the 1949 film The Third Man, in which Welles had a starring role. Peter Bogdanovich, disguised in a trench coat and dark glasses, appears as Welles' magician assistant. The film concludes with a spy film spoof, as Welles becomes involved in the abduction of "the most beautiful woman in Vienna" (Senta Berger), the kidnapper portrayed by Mickey Rooney.

References

External links
 

1968 films
British short films
Canadian comedy short films
Short films directed by Orson Welles
1960s English-language films
1960s Canadian films